The discography of Charles Hamilton, an American recording artist and producer. Hamilton has released three studio albums, one collaboration album, two extended play (EP), one hundred eighty-five mixtapes, four singles and seven music videos. Hamilton gained major attention after the release of his 2008 eight series mixtape project entitled "The Hamiltonization Process" which included the mixtapes Death Of The Mixtape Rapper, American Gangsta: Who Is Charles Hamilton?, And Then They Played Dilla, Staff Development, It's Charles Hamilton, The L Word, Sonic The Hamilton & Intervention.

Hamilton's debut studio album The Pink Lavalamp, was released on December 8, 2008 and issued on independent record label Demevolist Music Group for free download. Though not included on the album Hamilton's lead first promotional single "Brooklyn Girls" would chart at number ninety-seven on the Billboard Hot R&B/Hip-Hop Songs.

In 2015 Hamilton released his single entitled "New York Raining" with singer Rita Ora, from the Empire: Original Soundtrack from Season 1, it would chart on the number forty-six on the Billboard Hot R&B/Hip-Hop Songs & chart on the Billboard UK Singles Chart at number twenty-nine becoming the rapper's second charting single in seven years. Also in 2015, Hamilton's extended play, The Black Box, debuted at number one-hundred and sixty-eight on the Billboard 200, which would become Hamilton's first charting album on the Billboard.

Albums

Studio albums

Compilation album

EPs

Mixtapes

{| class="wikitable plainrowheaders" style="text-align:center;"
|+ List of mixtapes, with selected chart positions
! scope="col" style="width:12em;"| Title
! scope="col" style="width:18em;"| Album details
|-
! scope="row"| Crash Landed(Hosted by Skee)
|
 Released: 9 June 2008
 Label: Demevolist Music Group
 Formats: digital download
|-
! scope="row"| Outside Looking(Hosted by DJ Green Lantern)
|
 Released: 27 June 2008
 Label: Demevolist Music Group
 Formats: digital download
|-
! scope="row"| Death Of The Mixtape Rapper(Hosted by Skee)
|
 Released: 2 September 2008
 Label: Demevolist Music Group
 Formats: digital download
|-
! scope="row"| American Gangsta: Who Is Charles Hamilton?(Hosted by Skee)
|
 Released: 6 September 2008
 Label: Demevolist Music Group
 Formats: digital download
|-
! scope="row"| And Then They Played Dilla(Hosted by Skee)
|
 Released: 16 September 2008
 Label: Demevolist Music Group
 Formats: digital download
|-
! scope="row"| Staff Development(with Demevolist Music Group)(Hosted by Skee)
|
 Released: 30 September 2008
 Label: Demevolist Music Group
 Formats: digital download
|-
! scope="row"| It's Charles Hamilton(Hosted by Skee)
|
 Released: 15 October 2008
 Label: Demevolist Music Group
 Formats: digital download
|-
! scope="row"| The L Word(Hosted by Skee)
|
 Released: 28 October 2008
 Label: Demevolist Music Group
 Formats: digital download
|-
! scope="row"| Sonic The Hamilton(Hosted by Skee)
|
 Released: 11 November 2008
 Label: Demevolist Music Group
 Formats: digital download
|-
! scope="row"| Intervention(Hosted by Skee)
|
 Released: 25 November 2008
 Label: Demevolist Music Group
 Formats: digital download
|-
! scope="row"| Ayo! These Niggaz Went Hollywood(with Demevolist Music Group)(Hosted by DJ Tay James)
|
 Released: 1 December 2008
 Label: Demevolist Music Group
 Formats: digital download
|-
! scope="row"| The Broken Pink Lavalamp
|
 Released: 9 December 2008
 Label: Demevolist Music Group
 Formats: digital download
|-
! scope="row"| The Best Of The Hamiltonization Process(Hosted by Skee)
|
 Released: 19 January 2009
 Label: Demevolist Music Group
 Formats: digital download
|-
! scope="row"| Well Isn't This Awkward...(Hosted by Skee)
|
 Released: 13 February 2009
 Label: Demevolist Music Group
 Formats: digital download
|-
! scope="row"| My Brain Is Alive
|
 Released: 15 February 2009
 Label: Demevolist Music Group
 Formats: digital download
|-
! scope="row"| Every Charles Hamilton Ex-Girlfriend's Worse Nightmare
|
 Released: 18 February 2009
 Label: Demevolist Music Group
 Formats: digital download
|-
! scope="row"| First Order Of Business (Side A: Plan/Side B: Execute)(with Demevolist Music Group)
|
 Released: 23 February 2009
 Label: Demevolist Music Group
 Formats: digital download
|-
! scope="row"| The Dead Zone
|
 Released: 31 March 2009
 Label: Self-released
 Formats: digital download
|-
! scope="row"| Dope2Go (The Halo+Hamilton Project)(with DJ Halo)(Hosted by DJ Halo)
|
 Released: 17 April 2009
 Label: Self-released
 Formats: digital download
|-
! scope="row"| The Binge Vol. 1: Staring At The Lavalamp
|
 Released: 22 April 2009
 Label: Self-released
 Formats: digital download
|-
! scope="row"| Shut Up Already (3-Song Mixtape)
|
 Released: 6 May 2009
 Label: Self-released
 Formats: digital download
|-
! scope="row"| Normalcy
|
 Released: 28 December 2009
 Label: Self-released
 Formats: digital download
|-
! scope="row"| The Binge Vol. 3: Charles Hamilton's Last Mixtape.
|
 Released: 25 March 2010
 Label: Self-released
 Formats: digital download
|-
! scope="row"| Well This Isn't Awkward (Winner Takes All)
|
 Released: 3 July 2010
 Label: Self-released
 Formats: digital download
|-
! scope="row"| The L Word: Lust & Love (INComplete)
|
 Released: 4 July 2010 
 Label: Self-released
 Formats: digital download
|-
! scope="row"| Gynophobia
|
 Released: 14 July 2010
 Label: Self-released
 Formats: digital download
|-
! scope="row"| Atlantis And A...
|
 Released: 14 July 2010
 Label: Self-released
 Formats: digital download
|-
! scope="row"| 10 Things I Hate About Me
|
 Released: 14 July 2010
 Label: Self-released
 Formats: digital download
|-
! scope="row"| Segahamilton.blogspot.com
|
 Released: 6 August 2010
 Label: Self-released
 Formats: digital download
|-
! scope="row"| Starchaser Radio(with H2)
|
 Released: 3 September 2010
 Label: Self-released
 Formats: digital download
|-
! scope="row"| Starchaser Radio 2
|
 Released: 5 September 2010
 Label: Self-released
 Formats: digital download
|-
! scope="row"| For Your Locker
|
 Released: 9 September 2010
 Label: Self-released
 Format: digital download
|-
! scope="row"| Sonic The Hamilton 2: HD
|
 Released: 12 September 2010
 Label: Self-released
 Formats: digital download
|-
! scope="row"| The Blue Lavalamp: M/A/T/E (Mirrors Are The Enemy)
|
 Released: 14 September 2010
 Label: Self-released
 Formats: digital download
|-
! scope="row"| reIntervention
|
 Released: 24 September 2010
 Label: Self-released
 Formats: digital download
|-
! scope="row"| Snap Crackle Pop
|
 Released: 27 September 2010
 Label: Self-released
 Formats: digital download
|-
! scope="row"| One
|
 Released: 27 September 2010
 Label: Self-released
 Formats: digital download
|-
! scope="row"| Mic Check (The L Word 3)
|
 Released: 31 October 2010
 Label: Self-released
 Formats: digital download
|-
! scope="row"| Back To The Future, Back To The Haze(with Corporate)
|
 Released: 20 November 2010
 Label: Self-released
 Formats: digital download
|-
! scope="row"| From the desk of...(Hosted by DJ Whoo Kid)
|
 Released: 1 December 2010
 Label: Self-released
 Formats: digital download
|-
! scope="row"| Spelling Bee
|
 Released: 8 December 2010
 Label: Self-released
 Formats: digital download
|-
! scope="row"| This Perfect 3-Song Mixtape
|
 Released: 11 December 2010
 Label: Self-released
 Formats: digital download
|-
! scope="row"| Where Is Charles Hamilton? (W.I.C.H Craft)
|
 Released: 13 December 2010
 Label: Self-released
 Formats: digital download
|-
! scope="row"| The Hardest Mixtape EVER...Muthafuckas
|
 Released: 14 December 2010
 Label: Self-released
 Formats: digital download
|-
! scope="row"| Flamez Crib (Vol. 1 & 2)(with Demevolist Music Group)
|
 Released: 18 December 2010
 Label: Self-released
 Formats: digital download
|-
! scope="row"| 335(with Demevolist Music Group)
|
 Released: 28 December 2010
 Label: Self-released
 Formats: digital download
|-
! scope="row"| Autumn Harvest:...is a bi-polar rabbit
|
 Released: 3 June 2010
 Label: Self-released
 Formats: digital download
|-
! scope="row"| The Binge Vol. 2: Gathering Dust
|
 Released: 2010 Unknown
 Label: Self-released
 Formats: digital download
|-
! scope="row"| I Know Y'all Aint Got These
|
 Released: 21 January 2011
 Label: Self-released
 Formats: digital download
|-

! scope="row"| Attempt At Swag
|
 Released: 8 February 2011
 Label: Self-released
 Formats: digital download
|-
! scope="row"| The Power Of Illumination
|
 Released: 12 February 2011
 Label: Self-released
 Formats: digital download
|-
! scope="row"| Behind The Lavalamp (I'm Not Gay)
|
 Released: 25 April 2011
 Label: Self-released
 Formats: digital download
|-
! scope="row"| #NHF
|
 Released: 25 April 2011
 Label: Self-released
 Formats: digital download
|-
! scope="row"| Charlie And The Chocolate Factory
|
 Released: 20 May 2011
 Label: Self-released
 Formats: digital download
|-
! scope="row"| Sober Karaoke
|
 Released: 18 July 2011
 Label: Self-released
 Formats: digital download
|-
! scope="row"| C.A.T.S. Can
|
 Released: 23 September 2011 
 Label: Self-released
 Formats: digital download
|-
! scope="row"| What The Hell's Wrong With You?!
|
 Released: 5 October 2011
 Label: Self-released
 Formats: digital download
|-
! scope="row"| The UP
|
 Released: 7 October 2011
 Label: Self-released
 Formats: digital download
|-
! scope="row"| Arguments With Briana(with Briana Latrise)
|
 Released: 31 October 2011
 Label: Self-released
 Formats: digital download
|-
! scope="row" | Happy 9th Birthday
|
 Released: 18 November 2011
 Label: Self-released
 Formats: digital download
|-
! scope="row"| Excellence Of Execution: The Pink And Black Attack
|
 Released: 4 December 2011
 Label: Self-released
 Formats: digital download
|-
! scope="row"| And Then They Played Dilla 2: Fuck House Shoes
|
 Released: Unknown 2011
 Label: Self-released
 Formats: digital download
|-
! scope="row"| Arguments with Briana: When I Wanna Wonder
|
 Released: Unknown 2011
 Label: Self-released
 Formats: digital download
|-
! scope="row"| StH3: The Red Shoe Diaries/Entitlement/DOOM Kitty
|
 Released: Unknown 2011
 Label: Self-released
 Formats: digital download
|-
! scope="row"| The Truth Is Pink
|
 Released: Unknown 2011
 Label: Self-released
 Formats: digital download
|-
! scope="row"| Speechless In Brooklyn
|
 Released: 12 January 2012
 Label: Self-released
 Formats: digital download
|-
! scope="row"| LoadItCockItAimItBaby
|
 Released: January 2012
 Label: Self-released
 Formats: digital download
|-
! scope="row"| Andrea Mendez (The Opera Album)
|
 Released: 5 February 2012
 Label: Self-released
 Formats: digital download
|-
! scope="row"| ATNPM (After Them Niggas Played Madlib)
|
 Released: 5 February 2012
 Label: Self-released
 Formats: digital download
|-
! scope="row"| Hov Kitty (3/21)
|
 Released: 16 March 2012
 Label: Self-released
 Formats: digital download
|-
! scope="row"| Camera Coolant (Egyptian Circus)
|
 Released: 23 April 2012
 Label: Self-released
 Formats: digital download
|-
! scope="row"| Coke Whore Habits
|
 Released: 23 April 2012
 Label: Self-released
 Formats: digital download
|-
! scope="row"| 2012ilton: Music Inspired By Diablo III 
|
 Released: 23 May 2012
 Label: Self-released
 Formats: digital download
|-
! scope="row"| Ill Doesn't Meen Classic
|
 Released: 7 July 2012
 Label: Self-released
 Formats: digital download
|-
! scope="row"| Minaj Kitty (Awkward 3: CampusRedCarpet)
|
 Released: 12 July 2012
 Label: Self-released
 Formats: digital download
|-
! scope="row"| Uncle Jigga's Wardrobe
|
 Released: 12 July 2012
 Label: Self-released
 Formats: digital download
|-
! scope="row"| The Black Owl
|
 Released: 2 August 2012
 Label: Self-released
 Formats: digital download
|-
! scope="row"| August 14th: Doom Thousand & Twelve
|
 Released: 10 August 2012
 Label: Self-released
 Formats: digital download
|-
! scope="row"| I Always Die In Brooklyn
|
 Released: 25 August 2012
 Label: Self-released
 Formats: digital download
|-
! scope="row"| StH4: Shadow the Hamilton
|
 Released: 29 August 2012
 Label: Self-released
 Formats: digital download
|-
! scope="row"| Cinematic Hallucinations presents: The Bully & The Pet(with S.K.E. The Heistman)
|
 Released: 6 September 2012
 Label: Self-released
 Formats: digital download
|-
! scope="row"| Jack and the Box
|
 Released: 26 October 2012
 Label: Self-released
 Formats: digital download
|-
! scope="row"| the L Word V: Madonna's Submission
|
 Released: 6 November 2012
 Label: Self-released
 Formats: digital download
|-
! scope="row"| The Nils Styger Mixtape(with The Alchemist)
|
 Released: 1 December 2012
 Label: Self-released
 Formats: digital download
|-
! scope="row"| The Come Down
|
 Released: 21 December 2012 (US)
 Label: Self-released
 Format: digital download
|-
! scope="row"| StHRezzurexion
|
 Released: 23 December 2012
 Label: Self-released
 Formats: digital download
|-
! scope="row" | Ugly Desdemona
|
 Released: 23 December 2012
 Label: Self-released
 Formats: digital download
|-
! scope="row"| (KittyKitty) Awkwarde 4: Beyonce's War
|
 Released: Unknown 2012
 Label: Self-released
 Formats: digital download
|-
! scope="row"| 4Whore/StanleyIpkiss
|
 Released: Unknown 2012
 Label: Self-released
 Formats: digital download
|-
! scope="row" | And Then They Played Dilla 3: LifeSentence
|
 Released: Unknown, 2012
 Label: Self-released
 Formats: digital download
|-
! scope="row"| Al Simmon's Wedding Ring
|
 Released: Unknown 2012
 Label: Self-released
 Formats: digital download
|-
! scope="row"| Amberses
|
 Released: Unknown 2012
 Label: Self-released
 Formats: digital download
|-
! scope="row"| As A Mogul
|
 Released: Unknown 2012
 Label: Self-released
 Formats: digital download
|-
! scope="row"| As A Street Rat
|
 Released: Unknown 2012
 Label: Self-released
 Formats: digital download
|-
! scope="row" | Astro's Alchemized Science Project
|
 Released: Unknown, 2012
 Label: Self-released
 Formats: digital download
|-
! scope="row"| Bug Out
|
 Released: Unknown 2012
 Label: Self-released
 Formats: digital download
|-
! scope="row"| Chinese Laundry
|
 Released: Unknown 2012
 Label: Self-released
 Formats: digital download
|-
! scope="row"|Dragonfly Destiny
|
 Released: Unknown 2012
 Label: Self-released
 Formats: Music download, LP
|-
! scope="row"| E.O.C.H. Vol. 1 (The Mind Of Charles Hamilton)
|
 Released: Unknown 2012
 Label: Self-released
 Formats: digital download
|-
! scope="row"| E.O.C.H. Vol. 2 (The Body Of Charles Hamilton)
|
 Released: Unknown 2012
 Label: Self-released
 Formats: digital download
|-
! scope="row"| Edge's First Mixtape (TCHE)
|
 Released: Unknown 2012
 Label: Self-released
 Formats: digital download
|-
! scope="row"| Happy 9th Birthday! 2: Cruel Halloween OST
|
 Released: Unknown 2012
 Label: Self-released
 Formats: digital download
|-
! scope="row"| Herbal Essences Recall Order (She's My HERO)
|
 Released: Unknown 2012
 Label: Self-released
 Formats: digital download
|-
! scope="row"| Getting High Before Graduation
|
 Released: Unknown 2012
 Label: Self-released
 Formats: digital download
|-
! scope="row"| Gullible Me
|
 Released: Unknown 2012
 Label: Self-released
 Formats: digital download
|-
! scope="row"| MPCH=Gadget and Friends
|
 Released: Unknown 2012
 Label: Self-released
 Formats: digital download
|-
! scope="row"| Miami Heroine (Overdosage Of Liters)
|
 Released: Unknown 2012
 Label: Self-released
 Formats: digital download
|-
! scope="row"| Nadia Psalms
|
 Released: Unknown 2012
 Label: Self-released
 Formats: digital download
|-
! scope="row"| Phoenix Thursday
|
 Released: Unknown 2012
 Label: Self-released
 Formats: digital download
|-
! scope="row"| Separation Anxiety
|
 Released: Unknown 2012
 Label: Self-released
 Formats: digital download
|-
! scope="row"| Staff Development 2: Cold Case(with Sha-Leik)(Hosted by Sha-Leik)
|
 Released: Unknown 2012
 Label: Self-released
 Formats: digital download
|-
! scope="row"| StH5: SILver the Hamilton
|
 Released: Unknown 2012
 Label: Self-released
 Formats: digital download
|-
! scope="row"| Tafie2much: One 4 FDA
|
 Released: Unknown 2012
 Label: Self-released
 Formats: digital download
|-
! scope="row"| Thank You, Dr. Doom Vol. 1
|
 Released: Unknown 2012
 Label: Self-released
 Formats: digital download
|-
! scope="row"| the end of Charles Hamilton.
|
 Released: Unknown 2012
 Label: Self-released
 Formats: digital download
|-
! scope="row"| The Heart Of Charles Hamilton
|
 Released: Unknown 2012
 Label: Self-released
 Formats: digital download
|-
! scope="row"| The L Word 4: She's A Subtitle
|
 Released: Unknown 2012
 Label: Self-released
 Formats: digital download
|-
! scope="row"| The Soul Of Charles Hamilton
|
 Released: Unknown 2012
 Label: Self-released
 Formats: digital download
|-
! scope="row"| The Spiral Notebook
|
 Released: Unknown 2012
 Label: Self-released
 Formats: digital download
|-
! scope="row"| The Starlight Zone
|
 Released: Unknown 2012
 Label: Self-released
 Formats: digital download
|-
! scope="row"| Waitin' On Tasha
|
 Released: Unknown 2012
 Label: Self-released
 Formats: digital download
|-
! scope="row"| War With The Bullies
|
 Released: Unknown 2012
 Label: Self-released
 Formats: digital download
|-
! scope="row"| Catholic Illuminati: V2k12
|
 Released: 25 February 2013
 Label: Self-released
 Formats: digital download
|-
! scope="row" | Catholic Illuminati: Papal Infallibility
|
 Released: 28 February 2013 
 Label: Self-released
 Formats: digital download
|-
! scope="row"| MyPinkFriday.com
|
 Released: 30 April 2013
 Label: Self-released
 Formats: digital download
|-
! scope="row"| Rhapsody Case Closed
|
 Released: 30 April 2013
 Label: Self-released
 Formats: digital download
|-
! scope="row"| ''TWA Flight 801: Trailblazin|
 Released: June 2, 2013
 Label: Self-released
 Formats: digital download
|-
! scope="row"| Death And The Downs
|
 Released: 28 June 2013
 Label: Self-released
 Formats: digital download
|-
! scope="row"| SkateKey In '87
|
 Released: 17 August 2013
 Label: Self-released
 Formats: digital download
|-
! scope="row"| TWA Flight 801: Steve Smith And The Blazer
|
 Released: 17 August 2013
 Label: Self-released
 Formats: digital download
|-
! scope="row"| TWA Flight 801: The Clyde Drexler Spell
|
 Released: 27 August 2013
 Label: Self-released
 Formats: digital download
|-
! scope="row"| Autumn Holocaust (EscapeFromTheDeadZone)
|
 Released: 23 October 2013
 Label: Self-released
 Formats: digital download
|-
! scope="row"| StHZERO: The Death of Charles Hamilton
|
 Released: 1 November 2013
 Label: Self-released
 Formats: digital download
|-
! scope="row"| Winter Rush (EscapeFromTheDeadZone)
|
 Released: 10 November 2013
 Label: Self-released
 Formats: digital download
|-
! scope="row"| StHRezzurexion
|
 Released: 17 December 2013
 Label: Self-released
 Formats: digital download
|-
! scope="row"| A Shot In The Dark
|
 Released: Unknown 2013
 Label: Self-released
 Formats: digital download
|-
! scope="row"| And Then They Played Dilla IV: The Nastiest, Freakiest, Ratchetist Tribute You Could Ever Hear
|
 Released: Unknown 2013
 Label: Self-released
 Formats: digital download
|-
! scope="row"| Apocalyptic Rebellion
|
 Released: Unknown 2013
 Label: Self-released
 Formats: digital download
|-
! scope="row"| Catholic Illuminati: Infinite Psalms
|
 Released: Unknown 2013
 Label: Self-released
 Formats: digital download
|-
! scope="row"| Catholic Illuminati: The 9th Wonder Album
|
 Released: Unknown 2013
 Label: Self-released
 Formats: digital download
|-
! scope="row"| CH's Garage Sale
|
 Released: Unknown 2013
 Label: Self-released
 Formats: digital download
|-
! scope="row"| Happy 9th Birthday! Pt. 3: Nicki Minaj Goes To London
|
 Released: Unknown 2013
 Label: Self-released
 Formats: digital download
|-
! scope="row"| Kids In The Jungle
|
 Released: Unknown 2013
 Label: Self-released
 Formats: digital download
|-
! scope="row"| Last Train To London: The Album
|
 Released: Unknown 2013
 Label: Self-released
 Formats: digital download
|-
! scope="row"| Macaroni Surprise
|
 Released: Unknown 2013
 Label: Self-released
 Formats: digital download
|-
! scope="row"| Undone London
|
 Released: Unknown 2013
 Label: Self-released
 Formats: digital download
|-
! scope="row"| Unforgiven
|
 Released: 27 June 2014
 Label: Self-released
 Formats: digital download
|-
! scope="row"| Antithesis
|
 Released: 29 June 2014
 Label: Self-released
 Formats: digital download
|-
! scope="row"| Aware(Hosted by RapHeat.Com)
|
 Released: 6 July 2014
 Label: Self-released
 Formats: digital download
|-
! scope="row"| A Bad Representation of Ugly
|
 Released: Unknown 2014
 Label: Self-released
 Formats: digital download
|-
! scope="row"| African Child Pornography
|
 Released: Unknown 2014
 Label: Self-released
 Formats: digital download
|-
! scope="row"| Boy Who Played With Barbie
|
 Released: Unknown 2014
 Label: Self-released
 Formats: digital download
|-
! scope="row"| Chef Salad(with S.K.E The Heistman & Spud Mack)(Hosted by TearDropz)
|
 Released: Unknown 2014
 Label: Self-released
 Formats: digital download
|-
! scope="row"| Chronometry
|
 Released: Unknown, 2014
 Label: Self-released
 Formats: digital download
|-
! scope="row"| Forbidden Sunday
|
 Released: Unknown 2014
 Label: Self-released
 Formats: digital download
|-
! scope="row"| GunForRiven
|
 Released: Unknown 2014
 Label: Self-released
 Formats: digital download
|-
! scope="row"| If Ever I
|
 Released: Unknown 2014
 Label: Self-released
 Formats: digital download
|-
! scope="row"| Man Of The House
|
 Released: Unknown 2014
 Label: Self-released
 Formats: digital download
|-
! scope="row"| My Two Dads
|
 Released: Unknown 2014
 Label: Self-released
 Formats: digital download
|-
! scope="row"| Vampire Sunlight
|
 Released: Unknown 2014
 Label: Self-released
 Formats: digital download
|-
! scope="row"| Iconoclast
|
 Released: Unknown 2015
 Label: Self-released
 Formats: digital download
|-
! scope="row"| Loud and Wrong
|
 Released: January 24, 2016
 Label: Starchasers
 Formats: digital download
|-
! scope="row"| The Byte
|
 Released: March 13, 2016
 Label: Starchasers
 Formats: digital download
|-
! scope="row"| When Razor Met Wrist
|
 Released: March 13, 2016
 Label: Starchasers
 Formats: digital download
|-
! scope="row"| Fear the Reaper
|
 Released: March 18, 2016
 Label: Starchasers
 Formats: digital download
|-
! scope="row"| Feel the Reaper
|
 Released: March 18, 2016
 Label: Starchasers
 Formats: digital download
|-
! scope="row"| Kill the Reaper
|
 Released: March 18, 2016
 Label: Starchasers
 Formats: digital download
|-
! scope="row"| Anti-Hamilton
|
 Released: March 30, 2016
 Label: Starchasers
 Formats: digital download
|-
! scope="row"| SEGA Goes To Hell
|
 Released: April 2, 2016
 Label: Starchasers
 Formats: digital download
|-
! scope="row"| StH: Chaos
|
 Released: April 2, 2016
 Label: Starchasers 
 Formats: digital download
|-
! scope="row"| StH: Chaos vs Knuckles
|
 Released: April 2, 2016
 Label: Starchasers
 Formats: digital download
|-
! scope="row"| StH: The Rize of KnuckLES
|
 Released: April 2, 2016
 Label: Starchasers
 Formats: digital download
|-
! scope="row"| The L Word: Ultimate
|
 Released: April 3, 2016
 Label: Starchasers
 Formats: digital download
|-
! scope="row"| Here We Go Again...
|
 Released: April 8, 2016
 Label: Starchasers
 Formats: digital download
|-
! scope="row"| Mastery: The Love Album
|
 Released: April 26, 2016
 Label: Starchasers
 Formats: digital download
|-
! scope="row"| Cloud 9
|
 Released: April 29, 2016
 Label: Starchasers
 Formats: digital download
|-
! scope="row"|Smart Water(with Enjetic)
|
 Released: April 29, 2016
 Label: Starchasers
 Formats: digital download
|-
! scope="row"| Bacharach Attacks!
|
 Released: May 15, 2016
 Label: Starchasers
 Formats: digital download
|-
! scope="row"| Pet the Scorpion
|
 Released: May 15, 2016
 Label: Starchasers
 Formats: digital download
|-
! scope="row"| Blankets In Hell
|
 Released: May 21, 2016
 Label: Starchasers
 Formats: digital download
|-
! scope="row"| Please Listen To My Memo
|
 Released: June 5, 2016
 Label: Starchasers
 Formats: digital download
|-
! scope="row"| Just Go!
|
 Released: June 6, 2016
 Label: Starchasers
 Formats: digital download
|-
! scope="row"| MoreMagick
|
 Released: June 25, 2016
 Label: Starchasers
 Formats: digital download
|-
! scope="row"| Charles & Saner
|
 Unreleased: July 3, 2018
 Label: Starchasers
 Formats: digital download
|-
|}

Miscellaneous

Singles

As lead artist

Music videos

Guest appearances

Production credits

2008
Charles Hamilton - And Then They Played Dilla (mixtape)  
 "Coming Around" (Sample Credit: Slum Village - "Players") 
 "Owww" (Sample Credit: J Dilla - "Airworks") 
 "Convincedindecision" (Sample Credit: J Dilla - "U-Luv") 
 "Waterworks" (Sample Credit: J Dilla - "Don't Cry") 
 "Krispy Kreme Intentions" (Sample Credit: J Dilla - "Walkinonit") 
 "Bermuda Triangle" (Sample Credit: J Dilla - "Glazed") 
 "Losing Control, Revisited" (Sample Credit: J Dilla - "One Eleven") 
 "What's Going On" (Sample Credit: J Dilla - "Anti-American Graffiti")

Charles Hamilton - The Pink Lavalamp 
 "Music (Intro)" (Sample Credit: Graham Central Station - "Today") 
 "Loser" (Sample Credit: The Stylistics - "One Night Affair") 
 "She's So High" (Sample Credit: Telepopmusik - "Breathe") 
 "Voices" (Sample Credit: The Spinners - "It's A Shame")
 "Let Me Live" (Sample Credit: Diana Ross - "Love Hangover") 
 "Brighter Days" (Sample Credit: Ronnie Laws - "Friends And Strangers")
 "The Cookout" (Sample Credit: Parliament - "Mothership Connection (Star Child)")
 "Sat(t)elite" (Sample Credit: Shelby Lynne - "I Only Want To Be With You")
 "Live Life to the Fullest" (Sample Credit: The Jacksons - "Heart Break Hotel")
 "Come Back to You" (Sample Credit: The Isley Brothers - "Voyage To Atlantis")
 "Shinin'" (Sample Credit: Maze - "Golden Time of Day")
 "I’ll Be Around (Outro)" (Sample Credit: The Spinners - "I’ll Be Around")
 "Writing in the Sky" (Sample Credit: The Stylistics - "Betcha By Golly, Wow")
 "Boy Who Cried Wolf" (Sample Credit: Joe Simon - "You Don't Want To Believe It")

2009
Charles Hamilton - This Perfect Life
 "Barbara Walters" (Sample Credit: The Shadows - "Geronimo") 
 "Three Pound Bullet" (Sample Credit: Chicago - "Street Player") 
 "Ghosts" (Sample Credit: Suzanne Vega - "Tom's Diner") 
 "Post Lynching Ceremony" (Sample Credit: John Barry - "The Persuaders! Theme")
 "All Alone"
 "Cable in the Classroom" (Sample Credit: Luther Ingram - "To the Other Man" & J Dilla - "Gobstopper" ) 
 "Baby" (Sample Credit: Zodiac - "Super Sonic")
 "Reminder"
 "Tears of Fire" (Sample Credit: Jennifer Rush - "I Come Undone")
 "Long Socks" (Sample Credit: PJ Harvey - "The Mess We're In")
 "Rosado" (Sample Credit: Sade - "Kiss of Life")

2010
Charles Hamilton - T.A.F.I.E.T.U (The Album For Interscope Executives To Understand)
 "3rd and Goal" (Sample Credit: Gary Glitter - "Rock & Roll Part 2")  
 "Free Will" (Sample Credit: Culture Club - "Do You Really Want to Hurt Me") 
 "Laffy-Taffy Outro (Anti-Hater Zone)" (Sample Credit: Corey Hart - "Sunglasses at Night")
 "Stones On The Dancefloor" (Sample Credit: Audioslave - "Like a Stone")
 "Telemundo" (Sample Credit: Tito Nieves - "I Like It Like That")
 "The Loser's Revenge" (Sample Credit: The Stylistics - "One Night Affair")
 "The North Pole" (Sample Credit: The Gap Band - "Outstanding")
 "The Right Kind Of Brownies"
 "This Is Cheating"
 "Webster's"

Charles Hamilton - Grow Wing Pains
 "Some First Single Type Sh1t" (Sample Credit: Taking Back Sunday - "A Decade Under The Influence")  
 "More C Food" (Sample Credit: Peter Griffin - "Rock Lobster")  
 "Two Straws One Cup" (Sample Credit: Robin Thicke - "Lost Without U")  
 "Home Alone" (Sample Credit: LV - "How Long Has It Been")  
 "Twittering About Masturbation" (Sample Credit: Britney Spears - "Circus")  
 "Selective Deafness" (Sample Credit: Chevelle - "The Red") 
 "Advice From A Sunbeam" (Sample Credit: Maze - "Joy and Pain") 
 "SomeoneToTalkTo" (Sample Credit: Timothy McNealy - "Sagittarius Black") 
 "Tax Evasion" (Sample Credit: Air - "Surfing on a Rocket") 
 "Miss Stress" (Sample Credit: The Isley Brothers - "Make Me Say It Again") 
 "In-Flight Music" (Sample Credit: Dilated Peoples - "The Platform")
 "Coming Attractions" (Sample Credit: Bachman–Turner Overdrive - "Bachman Turner Overdrive")
 "In-Flight Music"
 "Coming Attractions"

2011
Mickey Factz 
"Letter To Sonic"

Charles Hamilton - Sober Karaoke (mixtape)  
 "Hi! What is Sober Karaoke" (Sample Credit: Charles Hamilton - "Garbage Rapper") 
 "Pretty In Pink"
 "Anger Management"
 "The Project Stairwell"
 "I Hate You, Charles Hamilton" (Sample Credit: Cher - "If I Could Turn Back Time") 
 "Till Last Summer"
 "On Some G ****"
 "Rebecca's Addiction" (Sample Credit: Henry Mancini - "Theme From "Love Story")
 "Friendship Bracelet" (Sample Credit: Cyndi Lauper - "Time After Time")
 "Charles in Charge" (Sample Credit: Shandi Sinnamon - "Charles in Charge")
 "Tarissa's Song v2.0" (Sample Credit: Wayne Wonder - "Saddest Day of My Life")
 "Karen Song 3.1" (Sample Credit: The Cardigans - "Lovefool")
 "See Ya Later!" (Sample Credit: Incubus - "Are You In?")
 "Rain Man 2" (Sample Credit: Eminem - "Rain Men")

2013
Charles Hamilton - Substance Abuse
 "Intro (Welcome to Psychosis)" 
 "Keep It Up"
 "Hell Yes"
 "Where I’ve Been" (Sample Credit: Bobby Caldwell - "What You Won't Do for Love")
 "Concubine"
 "Press C"
 "Return To Sender (Pink Within)" (Sample Credit: Chicago - "If You Leave Me Now")
 "Go Amy (Amy's Rose)"
 "Hard (Live From C. Hamilton's Place)"
 "The Desired Answer (Say Yes)" (Sample Credit: Avant - "Don't Say No, Just Say Yes")
 "I Hate Parties"
 "I Don't Care" (Charles Hamilton with Eminem)
 "Monday Mornings"
 "Disambiguation"
 "No Title"
 "Outro (As The Music Dies)"

2014
Charles Hamilton - My Heart
 "All Alone" 
 "Marketing"
 "Sega Music (Last Of The Mauratians)"
 "Make Me Beautiful"
 "Don't Download"
 "After Tonight..."
 "Speak No Louder"
 "Shining Shadows"
 "When I Rap"

2015
Various artist - Empire: Original Soundtrack from Season 1
 "New York Raining"

Bishop Nehru - The Nehruvian EP (mixtape)
 "You & I"

Charles Hamilton - The Black Box
 "Face The Music"
 "Crayola"
 "Lessons"
 "Down The Line"

References

NotesA  Originally meant to be released as Charles Hamilton's debut studio album in 2009 on Interscope: however due to Interscope dislike for the tracks "North Pole" & "Laffy Taffy Outro" it was shelved by the label.B  Originally this album was shelved by Hamilton but Hamilton would later leak it on August 14, 2010.C  Originally was supposed to be released as Hamilton's debut studio album, but due to Hamilton having disagreements with Interscope Records about having his first single "Brooklyn Girls" put on the album, he decided it would be best to release it as an independent album for his label at the time Demevolist Music Group.D  Originally meant to be his second studio album for Interscope, but he was dropped from the label before the actual release.E  Originally meant to be released as Charles Hamilton's debut studio album in 2009: however, it was rejected by Interscope Records due to the controversy of the album crediting deceased producer J Dilla as the executive producer. The album was also meant to have a movie included to go along with each song. Though the album being previously shelved it would be later leaked & then released by Hamilton independently for free download on September 24, 2009.F  Originally meant to be released as Charles Hamilton's debut studio album: however, it was also rejected by Interscope Records not liking the production of the album. However the album would later be leaked on April 18, 2013.G  Originally meant to be released as Charles Hamilton's debut studio album in 2010 on NewCo Records: however Hamilton would later shelve the album. Though the album being previously shelved it would be later leaked on May 30, 2014.H'''  This album was previously shelved by Hamilton but it would be later leaked on May 30, 2014.

Sources

Discographies of American artists
Hip hop discographies